"Cinta Terhalang" (translation: Inhibited Love) is a song performed by Malaysian singer Bob, who rose to prominence by placing fifth in the second season of Akademi Fantasia. The song, which was released in May 2008, serves as the first single of his upcoming untitled album.

Song dispute 
In the fourth concert of Akademi Fantasia, Season 6, Stacy was given the song as a reward for her consistent performance throughout the first four-week of the season. Thus, when the song is released as a single by Bob in May 2008, it created a controversy about the original singer of the song.

Bob claimed that the song was given by him firsthand by the original composer Sharon Paul. According to Sharon, the song was long ago sent to Astro to be given to any artist under the label. However, no response was given and thus, she decided to give the song to Bob to be recorded for his new album.

Nevertheless, Stacy's version was slightly altered in comparison to the original composition given to Bob. Sharon has also purposely changed the title to Cinta Khayalan for Stacy's version.

Single release 
The song was released to radio stations across Malaysia in May 2008.

Track listing 
 "Cinta Terhalang [Studio Version]" – 3:57

Award

2008 
In November 2008, the single was chosen to compete in Ballad Semi-finalist in Anugerah Juara Lagu 2008. Despite not making it to the final, Bob performed his very best and gave a heated competition to the other songs that he was competing with.

References 

2008 singles
Stacy (singer) songs
2008 songs
Pop songs